Sophronia Smith Hunt (October 1846—August 1, 1928) was an American woman who disguised herself as a man and secretly served as a soldier in the Union Army during the American Civil War. Her first soldier husband died after he was wounded at the Battle of Jenkins' Ferry. They served in the 29th Iowa Infantry Regiment.

Early life and education 
Sophronia Allen, daughter of Cyrus and Eunice (née Lewis) Allen, was born in October 1846, probably in Illinois. She had a rudimentary education. She married James Andrew Jackson Smith on September 4, 1863.

Civil War service
DeAnne Blanton writes that the existence of women soldiers such as Hunt "was no secret during or after the Civil War"; however, newspaper articles about them provided "few specific details about the individual woman's army career".  According to the Sioux City Journal, "Hunt was one of an estimated 400 women who dressed as a man and served on the front lines for the Union Army during the Civil War."

She enlisted in Company C, 29th Iowa Infantry Regiment, alongside her husband, in January 1864. After being found out about a month later, she was allowed to remain with the regiment as a battlefield nurse. The 29th Iowa Infantry regiment fought at the Battle of Jenkins Ferry at the end of April 1864, where her husband lost a leg in battle and subsequently died as a POW. She left the army, never having been wounded in battle.

Later life, death, and memorial
After mustering out, she married John Hunt, another Iowa veteran of the war. The couple had eight children, only one of whom survived her.

She died August 1, 1928 at Sioux City, Iowa, at age 81 years, 10 months. Installed 88 years after her death, her headstone carries the words: "Civil War Veteran."

Tim Gallagher writes in the Sioux City Journal:

See also
Bibliography of works on wartime cross-dressing
List of female American Civil War soldiers
Timeline of women in war in the United States, Pre-1945

Notes

References

Further reading 
 
 
 

1846 births
1928 deaths
Female wartime cross-dressers in the American Civil War
Women in the United States Army
American Civil War nurses
People of Iowa in the American Civil War